The 2009–10 MEAC men's basketball season marks the 39th season of Mid-Eastern Athletic Conference basketball.

Preseason
The MEAC season started on a tragic note, as Hampton captain Theo Smalling was shot and killed in an accidental shooting outside a nightclub.  The incident took place on October 24 and Smalling died two days later.

The Mid-Eastern Athletic Conference coaches and sports information directors voted Morgan State the preseason #1 and Norfolk State senior guard Michael DeLoach the preseason player of the year.

MEAC Preseason Poll

Preseason All-MEAC Team
First team
 Michael DeLoach, Norfolk State
 Reggie Holmes, Morgan State
 Jason Flagler, South Carolina State
 Neal Pitt, Maryland Eastern Shore
 Sam Coleman, Coppin State

Second team
 C. J. Reed, Bethune-Cookman
 Vincent Simpson, Hampton
 Michael Harper, Coppin State
 Kevin Thompson, Morgan State
 Paul Kirkpatrick, Howard

Preseason Player of the Year 
 Michael DeLoach, Norfolk State

Regular season

External links
 MEAC Official website

References